Mufti Ubaid ur Rahman is a Pakistani politician who had been a member of the Provincial Assembly of Khyber Pakhtunkhwa from August 2018 till January 2023.

Political career

He was elected to the Provincial Assembly of Khyber Pakhtunkhwa as an independent candidate from Constituency PK-27 (Kolai Palas Kohistan) in 2018 Pakistani general election.

References

Living people
Year of birth missing (living people)